Lhaki Dolma is a Bhutanese actress and politician who has been a member of the National Council of Bhutan, since May 2018.

Education 
Lhaki Dolma studied in the Semtokha Rigzhung School, a school for cultural and religious studies. She went on to pursue a Bachelor's degree in Language and Culture from College of Language and Culture Studies, under the Royal University of Bhutan. She also has a postgraduate degree (PG) in Development Management from Royal Institute of Management (RIM) in Thimphu.

Film career 
She has acted in 18 films in a career that she started when was attending her final year of the high school - securing the lead role in the Chepai Bhu (Beloved Son). Her performance in Chepai Bhu secured her the best actress award in the first National Film Awards in 2002. Ever since, she has been one of the most sought-after artistes in Bhutan.

Public service 
Lhaki Dolma topped the prestigious civil service selection exams, and went on work with Ministry of Agriculture and Forests. Getting a government job is the dream of most educated Bhutanese. However, she resigned from the government after three years to pursue a career in films where she resumed her acting life and also started scripting, producing and directing feature films.

Political career 
Dolma was sought after by all the political parties prior to the elections of 2013 because of her popularity. However, she chose the non-partisan National Council - the Upper House of the Parliament representing her native district of Punakha. She won by a landslide against a field of eight competitors of seasoned politicians and newcomers.

She is very close to her home constituency and makes frequent visits, thanks mainly to the close proximity to the Capital city, Thimphu, where she has her office with other parliamentarians.

Personal life 
Lhaki Dolma is deeply religious and a strict vegetarian. She is married and has two daughters and a son.

Filmography

References

External links

Interview with Lhaki Dolma: In Bhutan, we are very lucky that there is no discrimination between gender Asian Film Vault

Members of the National Council (Bhutan)
Bhutanese women in politics
Bhutanese actresses
Living people
Year of birth missing (living people)